Ralph Intranuovo (born December 11, 1973) is a Canadian former professional ice hockey left winger. He played 22 games in the National Hockey League with the Edmonton Oilers and Toronto Maple Leafs between 1995 and 1997. The rest of his career, which lasted from 1993 to 2013, was mainly spent in various European leagues. Internationally Intranuovo played for the Canadian national team at the 1995 World Championships, where he won a bronze medal.

Biography
Ralph Intranuovo was born in East York, Ontario the son of Marco Intranuovo, an Italian immigrant, and Rosa Intranuovo. As a youth, he played in the 1987 Quebec International Pee-Wee Hockey Tournament with the Toronto Red Wings minor ice hockey team.

Intranuovo was drafted in the fourth round, 96th overall, by the Edmonton Oilers in the 1992 NHL Entry Draft. He played in twenty-two games in the National Hockey League, nineteen with the Oilers and three with the Toronto Maple Leafs, scoring two goals and four assists.

Intranuovo played for Slovenian team HDD Olimpija Ljubljana of the Erste Bank Hockey League in Austria until 2009. He finished his career in Italian team Asiago Hockey AS.

Ralph Intranuovo is married to his high school sweetheart, Teri-Lou Turco.

Career statistics

Regular season and playoffs

International

References

External links
 

1973 births
Living people
Adler Mannheim players
Canadian expatriate ice hockey players in Austria
Canadian expatriate ice hockey players in Germany
Canadian expatriate ice hockey players in Slovenia
Canadian ice hockey left wingers
Canadian people of Italian descent
Cape Breton Oilers players
Edmonton Oilers draft picks
Edmonton Oilers players
EHC Black Wings Linz players
Essen Mosquitoes players
Hamilton Bulldogs (AHL) players
HDD Olimpija Ljubljana players
Iserlohn Roosters players
EC KAC players
Kölner Haie players
Manitoba Moose (IHL) players
People from East York, Toronto
Sault Ste. Marie Greyhounds players
Ice hockey people from Toronto
Toronto Maple Leafs players